Sound of Silver is the second studio album by American rock band LCD Soundsystem. The album was released jointly through DFA and Capitol Records in the United States and EMI elsewhere, first on March 12, 2007, in the United Kingdom. Sound of Silver was produced by the DFA and recorded during 2006 at Long View Farm in North Brookfield, Massachusetts and DFA Studios in New York, New York.  Upon release, Sound of Silver received acclaim from music critics, and it was later nominated for the Grammy Award for Best Electronic/Dance Album at the 50th Annual Grammy Awards.  The group's later released EP, entitled A Bunch of Stuff, was composed entirely of songs from this album.

Recording and composition
James Murphy recorded Sound of Silver at the Long View Farm in Massachusetts, where he had previously recorded LCD Soundsystem's eponymous debut album. Murphy was uncomfortable recording his own vocals, calling the experience "horrifying". Murphy covered the entire studio in silver fabric and tin foil. For the recording of LCD Soundsystem's following album This Is Happening, Murphy brought one of the original pieces of silver fabric to the album's recording studio in Los Angeles and hung it in Rick Rubin's recording den, the Mansion.

Musically, Sound of Silver has been described as dance-punk, dance-rock, electronica, electronic rock, and indie rock. Some songs use instrumentals from the band's six-part, 46-minute long 2006 composition "45:33". 

The album was dedicated to "the memory of Dr. George Kamen (1942–2006), one of the great minds of his or any generation." The Bulgarian-born doctor was a pioneer of group therapy and had opened a practice in New York City. It is insinuated the loss of 'someone' in the track "Someone Great" is Kamen.

Release
For several weeks before and after the album's release the entire album was available for streaming on the band's MySpace page. The video for the track "North American Scum" was also posted to the band's MySpace on February 8, 2007. On March 12, 2007, to coincide with its official UK release, an underground remix version of the album was released online in aid of charity.

Reception

Sound of Silver received widespread critical acclaim and holds a score of 86 out of 100 on the review aggregation website Metacritic, based on reviews from 41 critics, indicating "universal acclaim". The Guardians Dorian Lynskey singled out the "devastating emotional punch" of "Someone Great" and "All My Friends" for praise and described the album as "dance-rock for grown-ups: extraordinary." Andy Kellman of AllMusic felt that Sound of Silver, compared to LCD Soundsystem, was "less silly, funnier, less messy, sleeker, less rowdy, more fun, less distanced, more touching." Los Angeles Times critic Ann Powers wrote that Murphy "succeeds by stretching in two directions -- finding a new musical center, and showing his humanity beyond the laughs." Mark Pytlik of Pitchfork complimented Murphy's production sense and the album's "deep, spacious, and full-blooded" sound, concluding that "it's an absolute joy to listen to, for every possible reason, not the least of which is because, these days, those epiphanies feel like they're coming fewer and farther between."

Tim Jonze of NME wrote that while "Murphy's wise enough never to let his showing off spoil the fun, he can't avoid investing these songs with heart and soul ... that's what'll keep you hooked long after the beats have worn you out". Uncuts John Mulvey stated that "Murphy's talent is to proudly flaunt his influences, and to mix them up with belligerence, an exhilarating grasp of rock and dance dynamics, and a powerfully snarky sense of humour." Robert Christgau, writing in MSN Music, remarked that the album contained "one song so irresistible it makes you think the other tracks are songs too, which sometimes they are," later assigning it a two-star honorable mention rating.

By the end of 2007, it was ranked by Metacritic as the tenth best-reviewed album of the year.

Commercial
James Murphy stated that he would like the album to be in the top 40 on the U.S. Billboard Charts. It debuted on the Billboard 200 at number 46. As of January 2016, the album has sold about 225,000 copies in United States, according to Nielsen SoundScan. About 123,000 of those are physical copies, and about 101,000 of those are digital copies. The album reached number 28 on the UK charts.

Accolades
In December 2007, Sound of Silver was nominated for a Grammy Award for Best Electronic/Dance Album, eventually losing to We Are the Night by The Chemical Brothers. The album was also nominated for the 2007 Shortlist Prize, where it lost out to The Reminder by Feist.

It was also named album of the year by The Guardian, Uncut and Drowned in Sound. Pitchfork named two of the album's tracks ("Someone Great" and "All My Friends") in the top ten tracks of 2007 and the album itself was named the second best album of 2007. Entertainment Weekly and Rolling Stone both ranked it as the 7th best album of 2007. In 2008 Entertainment Weekly ranked it as one of the top 50 albums of the last 25 years. In January 2008, it was named the album of the year in both the 2007 Village Voice Pazz & Jop and Idolator Pop '07 polls. Time magazine named "All My Friends" one of The 10 Best Songs of 2007, ranking it at #4. The album placed fifth in The Wires annual critics' poll.

In 2009, Pitchfork named the track "All My Friends" as the second best song of the decade, while a month later Sound of Silver was ranked at number 17 in the website's list of the best albums of the 2000s. Rhapsody ranked the album at number five on its "100 Best Albums of the Decade" list. It was also named the twenty-third best album of the decade by Resident Advisor.

In 2012, Rolling Stone ranked the album at number 395 on its list of The 500 Greatest Albums of All Time.  The album was also included in the book 1001 Albums You Must Hear Before You Die.

In 2019, The Guardian ranked the album at number 5 on its list of 'The 100 best albums of the 21st century'.

On October 27, 2022, the song New York, I Love You but You're Bringing Me Down, was the final song played on WNYL Alt 92.3 before flipping to a simulcast of heritage all-news radio station WINS.

Track listing

Personnel
Credits adapted from liner notes.

LCD Soundsystem
 James Murphy – vocals , drums , percussion , bass , programming , piano , synthesizers , claps , guitar , organ , Casio , guitar bass , Clavinet , glockenspiel , electronic percussion , fun machine , kalimba 
 Patrick Mahoney – drums , percussion , claps , vocals 
 Tyler Pope – guitars , bass , fun machine , claps 
 Nancy Whang – vocals 
 Phillip Mossman

Additional musicians
 Eric Broucek – claps , vocals 
 Marcus Lambkin – claps 
 Morgan Wiley – piano 
 Justin Chearno – guitar 
 Jane Scarpantoni – cello 
 Lorenza Ponce – violin 1 
 Amy Kimball – violin 2 
 David Gold – viola 

Production
 The DFA – production
 James Murphy – mixing
 Dave Sardy – mixing
 Geoff Pesche – mastering
 Eric Broucek – assistance
 Matthew Thornley – engineering assistance
 Ian Neil – engineering assistance
 Jimmy Robertson – mix assistance
 Daniel Morrison – mix assistance

 Release
 Michael Vadino – art direction, photos
 Keith Wood – management
 Craig Averill – legal

Charts

Weekly charts

Year-end charts

Certifications

A Bunch of Stuff

It is a US-only release as all the songs on the EP were included on the Someone Great" single which was released in all other territories (excluding the Franz Ferdinand cover of "All My Friends", which since became a B-side to their 2008 single "Can't Stop Feeling").

Track listing
 "All My Friends" (Franz Ferdinand version)
 "Get Innocuous!" (Soulwax remix)
 "Sound of Silver" (Carl Craig's c2 rmx rev.3)
 "Us v Them" (Any Color U Like remix by Windsurf)
 "Time to Get Away" (Gucci Soundsystem remix)
 "Us v Them" (live on KCRW's "Morning Becomes Eclectic")

Notes and references
Notes

References

External links
 

2007 albums
LCD Soundsystem albums
DFA Records albums
Capitol Records albums
Albums recorded at Long View Farm